Broomhill is a village in Northumberland, England. It lies to the south-west of Amble, a short distance inland from the North Sea.

Broomhill is split into two, as it lies on the border of two districts: Morpeth (the county town of Northumberland) and Alnwick. South Broomhill, which is in the District of Morpeth, is considerably larger than North Broomhill.

Governance 
North Broomhill  is in the parliamentary constituency of Berwick-upon-Tweed.

Notable people 
Jack Dryden (1908–1975), professional association footballer

References

Villages in Northumberland